State Highway 165 (SH 165) is a state highway in the state of Texas in the United States. It is no longer connected to any other Texas highway system roads.

Route description

Officially, SH 165 runs north along Comal Street from 7th Street into and within the Texas State Cemetery in Austin. As of December 2005, it is signed only within the State Cemetery while the Comal Street portion is unsigned.

History
SH 165 was designated on February 26, 1930 from 6th and Onion streets to 11th Street. It was numbered SH 165 on August 1, 1930. In 1932, Texas historian Louis Kemp brought the neglected Texas State Cemetery to the attention of officials at the Texas Highway Department. At the time, the  State Cemetery, located just east of current downtown Austin, had no roads. The Highway Department established a highway to and created and paved roads through the cemetery. The highway to the State Cemetery was also previously known informally as the "Lou Kemp Highway".

At various times, SH 165 originated from US Highway 290 (US 290) and SH 20 (probably the same route redesignated) in downtown Austin, and at Loop 343. On November 20, 1939, SH 165 was truncated from 6th Street to 7th Street. In 1965, SH 165 was truncated to Comal Street from 7th Street to the entrance of the State Cemetery as well as the roads within the cemetery. At that time, Loop 343 ran along 7th Street (which borders the State Cemetery). In 1977, the eastern section of Loop 343, including the routing along 7th Street, was deleted from the Texas highway system, leaving SH 165 officially isolated from other highways in the Texas highway system. However, the Texas State Cemetery—and SH 165—are located just six blocks east of Interstate 35.

Major intersections

References

Transportation in Austin, Texas
Transportation in Travis County, Texas
165
State highways in the United States shorter than one mile